The Republic of Latvia has submitted a variety of films for the Academy Award for Best International Feature Film at the Academy Awards. The award is given annually by the Academy of Motion Picture Arts and Sciences to a feature-length motion picture produced outside the United States that contains primarily non-English dialogue, and was first presented at the 29th Academy Awards.

The academy selection committee reviews all submissions for this award, and secret ballot voting is used to determine the five nominees each year. For Latvia, the panel deciding on submissions works on behalf of the National Film Centre of Latvia (NFCL), consisting of Latvian Filmmakers Union chairperson Ieva Romanova, state secretary of the Ministry of Culture Dace Vilsone, critic Kristīne Simsone, film historian Viktors Freibergs, director and Latvian Academy of Culture [lv] professor Dāvis Sīmanis, as well as producer and head of VFS Films Uldis Cekulis. Dita Rietuma, film historian and director of the NFCL, was elected as the head of the panel in 2020. In 2021, chairwoman of the Latvian Cinematographers Union Zane Balčus, as well as film director and chairman of the Baltic Sea Documentary Film Forum Dzintars Dreibergs, was elected. They would hold a meeting to decide on the submission, and after announcing it, would give an explanation as to why said film was chosen.

A month after restoring independence, Latvia was recognized by the Soviet Union in September 1991, bringing the Latvian Soviet Socialist Republic to an end. In 1992, they sent their first-ever film for consideration, a comedy film titled The Child of Man, written and directed by Jānis Streičs, at the 65th Academy Awards. The film was considered alongside 32 other films but failed to be nominated. They made their next submission in 2008 for the 80th Awards, another in 2010 for the 83rd, and another in 2012 for the 85th, and have sent a film each year since then. In total, Latvia has made 13 submissions to the category, all of which were not nominated, the latest being the 2021 submission The Pit.

List of submissions

Submission reasoning

External commentaries

See also 

 List of countries by number of Academy Awards for Best International Feature Film
 Cinema of Latvia
 List of Lithuanian submissions for the Academy Award for Best International Feature Film (neighbouring country also with no nominations)

Notes

References

External links 

 Academy of Motion Picture Arts and Sciences official website
 National Film Centre of Latvia official website

Latvia
Academy Award submissions